Washburne State Wayside is a state park  northwest of Junction City, in the U.S. state of Oregon. Administered by the Oregon Parks and Recreation Department, the wayside serves as a rest stop for travelers on Oregon Route 99W and interpretive center for the Applegate Trail. The state bought the land for the park in 1926 from William C. and Mae E. Washburne. It lies on the border between Lane and Benton counties.

Amenities include picnic tables, a restroom, a nature trail, and interpretive signs about the Applegate Trail. The day-use park, open year-round, is visited by about 131,000  people a year. The nature trail leads into a forest of second-growth Douglas fir. this is no longer a park it is private owned land and the big  trees have been logged off.

See also
 List of Oregon state parks

References

External links
Oregon State Parks auctioning off 38-acre woodland to the public - OregonLive

State parks of Oregon
Parks in Benton County, Oregon
Parks in Lane County, Oregon